Saskatoon County was a provincial electoral division  for the Legislative Assembly of the province of Saskatchewan, Canada. Created as "Saskatoon" before the 1st Saskatchewan general election in 1905, the district encompassed the three communities that merged to form the city in 1906. A new urban riding was created for the rapidly growing city in 1908, with the existing rural constituency being redrawn and renamed Saskatoon County for the 2nd Saskatchewan general election. The riding was abolished into the districts of Rosthern and Hanley before the 8th Saskatchewan general election in 1934.

It is now part of the constituencies of Martensville, Saskatoon Southeast, and Rosetown-Elrose.

Members of the Legislative Assembly

Election results

|-

 
|Provincial Rights
|Hugh Edwin Munroe
|align="right"|803
|align="right"|45.63%
|align="right"|–
|- bgcolor="white"
!align="left" colspan=3|Total
!align="right"|1,760
!align="right"|100.00%
!align="right"|

|-

 
|Provincial Rights
|Paul L. Sommerfeld
|align="right"|766
|align="right"|49.52%
|align="right"|+3.89
|- bgcolor="white"
!align="left" colspan=3|Total
!align="right"|1,547
!align="right"|100.00%
!align="right"|

|-

 
|Conservative
|W.H. Bulmer
|align="right"|500
|align="right"|35.16%
|align="right"|-14.36
|- bgcolor="white"
!align="left" colspan=3|Total
!align="right"|1,422
!align="right"|100.00%
!align="right"|

|-

 
|Conservative
|Reuben Alfred Locke
|align="right"|757
|align="right"|35.41%
|align="right"|+0.25
|- bgcolor="white"
!align="left" colspan=3|Total
!align="right"|2,138
!align="right"|100.00%
!align="right"|

|-

|- bgcolor="white"
!align="left" colspan=3|Total
!align="right"|2,551
!align="right"|100.00%
!align="right"|

|-

|- bgcolor="white"
!align="left" colspan=3|Total
!align="right"|2,573
!align="right"|100.00%
!align="right"|

|-

 
|Conservative
|George Miller Huffman
|align="right"|1,499
|align="right"|37.31%
|align="right"|-

|- bgcolor="white"
!align="left" colspan=3|Total
!align="right"|4,017
!align="right"|100.00%
!align="right"|

See also
Saskatoon – Northwest Territories territorial electoral district (1870–1905).

Electoral district (Canada)
List of Saskatchewan provincial electoral districts
List of Saskatchewan general elections
List of political parties in Saskatchewan
Rural Municipality of Corman Park No. 344

References
 Saskatchewan Archives Board – Saskatchewan Election Results By Electoral Division

Former provincial electoral districts of Saskatchewan